Will Scheffer is an American playwright, and was co-creator and executive producer of the television series Big Love and the American remake of  Getting On  with longtime life partner Mark V. Olsen. He is President and CEO of Anima Sola Productions, which he founded with Olsen in 1992 to create television and film content.

His writing credits include Big Love: In the Beginning, Ellis Island, Duck Town, Easter, In the Gloaming, The Pact, Citizen Baines, and Getting On.

Life

Family
Scheffer's father, Ben, was a Holocaust survivor, who emigrated from the Netherlands through Ellis Island in 1941. His mother, Sandra, was the daughter of Jews who fled Russia in 1916.

Education
Scheffer attended State University of New York at Purchase where he earned a Bachelor of Fine Arts with Honors in Theater.

Career
In 1997, Scheffer was honored with the Variety magazine "One of the Rising Writers to Watch" award. He has also taught and lectured at Bernard M. Baruch College, Lewis and Clark College and School of Visual Arts, Manhattan, New York City.

Personal life
Scheffer is openly gay; he and Olsen have been married to each other since the early 1990s. About their collaborative process, Scheffer said: "Mark and I talk everything through but don't actually write together. We take turns on drafts, passing them back and forth for multiple revisions. Sometimes I'll write the first draft and he'll revise and sometimes he'll write the first draft. On set it's looser and we'll have to revise together but we prefer to actually write in our own space. The 'fantasy' image of having desks facing each other and tossing lines back and forth doesn't work for us."

Works

References

External links 

 

Place of birth missing (living people)
Living people
American people of Dutch-Jewish descent
American people of Russian-Jewish descent
American dramatists and playwrights
American male dramatists and playwrights
American male screenwriters
Jewish American dramatists and playwrights
American male television writers
American soap opera writers
Television producers from New York (state)
Showrunners
LGBT producers
American gay writers
State University of New York at Purchase alumni
Baruch College faculty
Lewis & Clark College faculty
School of Visual Arts faculty
Writers Guild of America Award winners
1969 births
Screenwriters from New York (state)
Screenwriters from Oregon
21st-century American Jews